Mieczysław Albert Maria Krąpiec OP (May 25, 1921 in Berezowica Mała near Ternopil – May 8, 2008 in Lublin) – a Polish Roman Catholic priest, philosopher (thomist), theologian, humanist and social scientist, the rector of Katolicki Uniwersytet Lubelski (1970-1983), the founder of the Lublin Philosophical School, the initiator and president of the scientific committee of Powszechna Encyklopedia Filozofii.

Sources
Polish Society of Thomas Aquinas

1921 births
2008 deaths
John Paul II Catholic University of Lublin
Dominican Order
20th-century Polish Roman Catholic priests
Catholic philosophers
Thomists
20th-century Polish philosophers